Oldřich Pštros (born 1903, date of death unknown) was a Czech wrestler. He competed in the Greco-Roman middleweight event at the 1924 Summer Olympics.

References

External links
 

1901 births
Year of death missing
Olympic wrestlers of Czechoslovakia
Wrestlers at the 1924 Summer Olympics
Czech male sport wrestlers
Place of birth missing